A Question of Trust is a 1920 British silent adventure film directed by Maurice Elvey and starring Madge Stuart, Harvey Braban and Teddy Arundell. It was based on a short story by Ethel M. Dell.

Premise
A young man leads a rebellion against the corrupt Governor who had his father executed.

Cast
 Madge Stuart - Stephanie 
 Harvey Braban - Pierre Dumaresque 
 Teddy Arundell - Jouvain 
 Charles Croker-King - Governor of Maritas 
 Kitty Fielder - Anita

References

External links
 

1920 films
1920 adventure films
British adventure films
British silent feature films
1920s English-language films
Films directed by Maurice Elvey
British black-and-white films
Films based on works by Ethel M. Dell
Films based on short fiction
1920s British films
Silent adventure films